Dog Boy may refer to:
 Dog Boy (singer)
 Dog Boy (novel)
 Dog Boy (album), 2021 studio album by ZillaKami